Colnrade is a municipality in the district of Oldenburg in Lower Saxony, Germany.

References 

Oldenburg (district)